Harumi Nakazato (中里晴美 , Nakazato Harumi, born June 2, 1962) is a Japanese sprint canoer who competed in the late 1980s. At the 1988 Summer Olympics in Seoul, she was eliminated in the repechages of the K-2 500 m event.

External links
Sports-reference.com profile

1962 births
Canoeists at the 1988 Summer Olympics
Japanese female canoeists
Living people
Olympic canoeists of Japan